Dabuy-ye Jonubi Rural District is a rural district (dehestan) in Dabudasht District, Amol County, Mazandaran Province, Iran. At the 2006 census, its population was 37,796, in 9,793 families. The rural district has 86 villages.

References 

Rural Districts of Mazandaran Province
Amol County